This is a list of vice presidential or similar positions, and the current office holders:

Member states of the United Nations

Countries with a vice president (or similar position)

Countries with a ex-officio Designated Acting Head of State

States recognised by some United Nations member states

Countries with a vice president

Countries with a ex-officio Designated Acting Head of State

States recognised by no United Nations member states

Countries with a vice president

Countries with a ex-officio Designated Acting Head of State

Alternative governments

Alternative governments with a vice president (or similar position)

See also
 List of vice presidents in 
 List of current heads of state and government
 List of current presidents of legislatures
 List of elected or appointed female deputy heads of state
 Lists of office-holders

Notes

References

Lists of vice presidents
Vice Presidents